Andoor Kandan Sree Dharma Sastha Temple is one of the renowned Sastha Temples in south Kerala. It is situated 13 km east of Neyyattinkara i.e. 32 km south-east of Thiruvananthapuram, Kerala. The God Kandan Sree Dharma Sastha is the main deity of this temple. It is considered to be one of the rarest temples in Kerala having the God Sastha facing the west.

The name got as Andoor kandan Sree Dharma Sastha because of the presence of God Kandan Sree Dharma Sastha and the temple located in Andoorkonam. God Ayyappa is considered as the protector of this region, hence the god is also called as Andoorvasan and Andoorayan. The temple has its history and origin from Tholadichan Temple, which is located 750 feet east of the temple.

Tholadichan Kovil 

The mythology behind the temple is that, years before those travelers using the path in tholady used to cut the branches of the nearby trees and beat the sticks nearby the idol of God Ayyappa to get the skin of the sticks to be contused, it was done for their well beings and to ensure a safe journey, consequently the place got the name Tholady. A small temple was built in that location years ago and this has been preserved and treated as the moolakshethram since then.

Main Temple 

It was a kavu with big trees, thickets and weeds; and it was developed over period as a major temple in this region. The temple is also known as Andoorkavu.

Main Deity 

God Sree Dharma Sastha is the main deity in this temple. The idol is same as we see at Sabarimala; the right hand is held in the Abhaya Mudra posture and symbolises the fearlessness of a true devotee who has surrendered to the Lord (Saranaagathi) and the protection that the Lord offers to those who surrender totally to him.  This posture is also called Chinmudra or Njaana Mudra and symbolises the union of Aatma with Paramaatma (represented by the index finger touching the base of the thumb) after the three impurities (asudhi) of ego (aham), lust (kamam) and illusion (maayam), represented by the three fingers pointing away from the body, has been destroyed.

The left hand, with all five fingers, points downwards. This represents the five elements (He is called Bhoothanathan meaning that he is the lord who created and controls the evolvement of the five elements (Panja (5) Bhootham (element), which make up the material world we live in. The five elements are earth (solid), water (liquid), fire (chemical combustion), air (gaseous), and ether (space).

The idol is made in the form of sitting but the legs have been risen a little and it reveals that his legs have been given to nobody to sit aside. He has also bound his two knees and his back with Yogapatta.

Sub Deities (Upa Devas) 

Ganapathy

God Ganapathy, revered as the remover of obstacles and the god of beginnings, is always honored at the start of each rituals and ceremonies in this temple. Ashta Dravya Maha Ganapathy Homam is performed during the occasion of Prathishta Vaarshikam.

Durga Bhagavathy

Goddess Durga Bhagavathy, the principal form of goddess also known as Devi and Shakthi is being worshipped here with special poojas including Bhagavathy Seva on special occasions. Hundreds of women devotees offer Pongala to Durga Bhagavathy on Makaram 1 of each year.

Easwara Kala Bhoothathan

God Shiva is worshipped in the form of Sri Easwara Kala Bhoothathan in this temple. God Shiva gets pleased easily and fulfills people's desire easily; the chanting of Nama Sivaya frees people from sins and brings them complacence.

Nagaraja & Nagayakshi

Nagaraja & Nagayakshi are the supreme of Snake gods, which is being worshipped in this temple since years. Every year during the occasion of makarvilakku festival and Prathishta Vaarshikam, Vishesha Nagaroottu is performed, which is offered and attended by all devotees to attain salvation from Sarpa doshas and Drishti doshas and for curing diseases and getting healthy children.

Elephant at the entrance

There is an idol of elephant at the entrance of the temple facing God Sri Dharma Sastha. The elephant was there in front of the main shrine since the old shrines were built. And when the new shrines were built in 2002; during the period of completion of the shrines and installation of idols, the committee members were regularly disturbed over nights by the trumpeting and growling sound of an elephant, and after that they realized that the idol of elephant was unnoticed and misplaced unintentionally. Hence, they realized the importance of the elephant and installed the idol in front of the temple facing God Sree Dharma Sastha, the main deity.

Special Rituals and Offerings 

Villadichan Paattu: It is being performed for a period of 60 days which starts from the beginning of mandalakalam (i.e., Vrishchikam 1) and ends on the last day of Makaravilakku Mahotsavam (i.e., Makaram 1). On the last day, it ends with a special Vazhka song, the event is known as Vazhka Paadi Kudiyiruthal.

Neeranjana Archana: It is the most performed archana in this temple as God Sastha is believed to be Saneeswaran. It is performed on Wednesdays and Saturdays.

Festival 

Makaravilakku Mahotsavam is the festival celebrated in this temple annually, which belongs to the natural phenomenon that the star (Makara Jyothi) rises in the sky at the evening (Makara Sankrama Sandhya) of 14 January. It is believed that on this day God Ayyappa defeated demon Mahishasura and merged with the Dharma Sastha Murthy at Sabarimala. Makara Sankrama Sandhya is the time when the Dakshinayana Punyakalam ends and Utharayana Punyakalam starts.

Temple timings 

The temple opens daily at 05.00 PM and closes at 08:00 PM. During the period from Vrishchikam 1 to Makaram 1 (60 days) and on days of first of each Malayalam maasam, Ayillyam and Uthram, the temple opens in the morning also.

Temple Photos

Google Map Location

Hindu temples in Thiruvananthapuram district